Hylkje is a village in the borough of Åsane in the municipality of Bergen in Vestland county, Norway. The village lies in the northeastern part of the municipality, along the Sørfjorden. The European route E39 runs through Hylkje.

Since 2013, the village population statistics have no longer been tracked because the village is now included in the population statistics for the city of Bergen.

References

Villages in Vestland